Death du Jour is the second novel by Kathy Reichs starring forensic anthropologist  Temperance Brennan.

Plot
On a bitterly cold March night in Montreal, Quebec, Canada, Brennan is exhuming the remains of a nun proposed for sainthood in the grounds of a church. Hours later she's called to the scene of an horrific arson, where a young family has perished. There seem to be no witnesses, motive and no explanation. From the charred remains of the inferno to a trail of sinister cult activity which leads her to Beaufort, South Carolina and a terrifying showdown during an ice storm back in Canada, Brennan faces a test of both her forensic expertise and her survival instinct.

External links
Kathy Reichs' page on Death du Jour

Reviews 

1999 American novels
Novels by Kathy Reichs
Novels set in Montreal
Charles Scribner's Sons books
Heinemann (publisher) books